Li Jianwu (17 August 1906 - 24 November 1982) was a Chinese author, dramatist and translator who was the president of French Literature Research Council. Li was an officer of the Chinese State Council and a member of National Committee of the Chinese People's Political Consultative Conference. He translated the works of the French novelists Gustave Flaubert and Stendhal into Chinese.

In 1925, he was arrested for opposing Ma Junwu.

Biography
Li was born in 1906 in Yuncheng County, Shanxi, his father, Li Mingfeng, was a warlord of Qing Empire.

After the downfall of Yuan Shih-kai Administration, Li moved to Beijing with his family, he studied at Beijing Normal University Elementary School.

At the age of 13, his father Li Mingfeng was killed by Anhui clique General Chen Shufan.

Li attended The High School Affiliated to Beijing Normal University in 1921, at the same time, he started to publish works, he made acquaintance with Wang Tongzhao.

In 1925, Li was put under house arrest for his opposition to Minister of Education Ma Junwu.

Li entered Tsinghua University in 1925, majoring in Western languages.

In 1931, Li studied at University of Paris. After graduating in 1933, he taught at Jinan University.

During the Second Sino-Japanese War, Li moved to the French Concession to escape the violence. There he met Zheng Zhenduo, A Ying and Xia Yan.

After the founding of the Communist State, Li worked as a researcher at Peking University and the Chinese Academy of Sciences.

Works
 Memoirs of a Madman (Gustave Flaubert)
 Sentimental Education (Gustave Flaubert)
 Dictionary of Received Ideas (Gustave Flaubert)
 Madame Bovary (Gustave Flaubert)
 Italian Chroniques (Stendhal)
 Armance (Stendhal)
 The Red and the Black (Stendhal)
 Lucien Leuwen (Stendhal)
 The Charterhouse of Parma (Stendhal)

References

1906 births
1982 deaths
People from Yuncheng
People's Republic of China translators
French–Chinese translators
Tsinghua University alumni
University of Paris alumni
Academic staff of Jinan University
20th-century Chinese translators